Mount Bruns is a mountain in Antarctica,  high, standing  north of Mount Lowry in the Anderson Hills in the northern Patuxent Range of the Pensacola Mountains. It was mapped by the United States Geological Survey from surveys and from U.S. Navy air photos, 1956–66, and named by the Advisory Committee on Antarctic Names for John E. Bruns, a glaciologist at Palmer Station during the winter of 1967.

References 

Mountains of Queen Elizabeth Land
Pensacola Mountains